Alina Saldanha  is an Indian politician from the state of Goa. She is former member of the Goa Legislative Assembly representing the Cortalim constituency.

Political career
She entered politics after the death of her husband José Matanhy de Saldanha in 2012, he was the sitting member of the Goa Legislative Assembly representing the Cortalim constituency. She fought the by poll from his seat.

Ministry
She was the only woman Minister in the Laxmikant Parsekar led government in Goa.

Portfolios
She is in charge of
Environment
Rural Development
Ex-Forest 
Museum
Science & Technology

References

External links 
 Council of Ministers

Members of the Goa Legislative Assembly
Living people
Women in Goa politics
People from Mormugao
Year of birth missing (living people)
21st-century Indian women politicians
21st-century Indian politicians
Bharatiya Janata Party politicians from Goa
Aam Aadmi Party politicians from Goa
Goa MLAs 2017–2022
Women members of the Goa Legislative Assembly